Taman Selasih is a suburb of Kulim, Kedah, Malaysia. The name is termed in the Malay language. Taman means garden or neighborhood in this context, and Selasih refers to Basil leaves in the local language. It is believed that the land was populated by Basil plants in considerably significant amount, hence the name of the residence area.  

Populated places in Kedah